Gothenburg Municipality is one of the 29 multi-member constituencies of the Riksdag, the national legislature of Sweden. The constituency was established in 1970 when the Riksdag changed from a bicameral legislature to an unicameral legislature. It is conterminous with the municipality of Gothenburg. The constituency currently elects 17 of the 349 members of the Riksdag using the open party-list proportional representation electoral system. At the 2022 general election it had 434,273 registered electors.

Electoral system
Gothenburg Municipality currently elects 17 of the 349 members of the Riksdag using the open party-list proportional representation electoral system. Constituency seats are allocated using the modified Sainte-Laguë method. Only parties that that reach the 4% national threshold and parties that receive at least 12% of the vote in the constituency compete for constituency seats. Supplementary leveling seats may also be allocated at the constituency level to parties that reach the 4% national threshold.

Election results

Summary

(Excludes leveling seats)

Detailed

2020s

2022
Results of the 2022 general election held on 11 September 2022:

The following candidates were elected:
 Constituency seats - Leila Ali Elmi (MP), 1,616 votes; Magnus Berntsson (KD), 157 votes; Johan Büser (S), 949 votes; Gunilla Carlsson (S), 1,000 votes; Dzenan Cisija (S), 1,487 votes; Dennis Dioukarev  (SD), 123 votes; Gustaf Göthberg (M), 555 votes; Tony Haddou (V), 960 votes; Marie-Louise Hänel Sandström (M), 2,867 votes; Robert Hannah (L), 1,092 votes; Mattias Jonsson (S), 2,920 votes; David Josefsson (M), 1,031 votes; Maj Karlsson (V), 1,988 votes; Rickard Nordin (C), 267 votes; Amalia Rud Pedersen (S), 1,769 votes; Jimmy Ståhl (SD), 162 votes; and Björn Tidland (SD), 23 votes.
 Leveling seats - Emma Nohrén (MP), 1,169 votes.

2010s

2018
Results of the 2018 general election held on 9 September 2018:

The following candidates were elected:
 Constituency seats - Leila Ali Elmi (MP), 1,467 votes; Johan Büser (S), 675 votes; Gunilla Carlsson (S), 1,358 votes; Alexander Christiansson (SD), 58 votes; Dennis Dioukarev  (SD), 151 votes; Tony Haddou (V), 519 votes; Hampus Hagman (KD), 126 votes; Marie-Louise Hänel Sandström (M), 1,628 votes; Robert Hannah (L), 1,954 votes; Lars Hjälmered (M), 3,571 votes; Anna Johansson (S), 4,646 votes; Mattias Jonsson (S), 1,737 votes; David Josefsson (M), 391 votes; Maj Karlsson (V), 2,929 votes; Rickard Nordin (C), 340 votes; Yasmine Posio (V), 1,096 votes; and Hans Rothenberg (M), 517 votes.
 Leveling seats - Maria Nilsson (L), 435 votes; and Anna Sibinska (MP), 512 votes.

2014
Results of the 2014 general election held on 14 September 2014:

The following candidates were elected:
 Constituency seats - Johan Büser (S), 566 votes; Gunilla Carlsson (S), 1,174 votes; Robert Hannah (FP), 1,716 votes; Lars Hjälmered (M), 3,370 votes; Anna Johansson (S), 6,359 votes; Mattias Jonsson (S), 1,653 votes; Maj Karlsson (V), 885 votes; Martin Kinnunen (SD), 3 votes; Hans Linde (V), 1,721 votes; Cecilia Magnusson (M), 3,098 votes; Aron Modig (KD), 629 votes; Valter Mutt (MP), 270 votes; Lise Nordin (MP), 2,430 votes; Rickard Nordin (C), 322 votes; Hans Rothenberg (M), 655 votes; Jimmy Ståhl (SD), 60 votes; and Lisbeth Sundén Andersson (M), 321 votes.

2010
Results of the 2010 general election held on 19 September 2010:

The following candidates were elected:
 Constituency seats - Gunilla Carlsson (S), 1,943 votes; Annelie Enochson (KD), 3,208 votes; Eva Flyborg (FP), 1,533 votes; Susanna Haby (M), 2,225 votes; Shadiye Heydari (S), 1,964 votes; Lars Hjälmered (M), 2,502 votes; Lars Johansson (S), 687 votes; Mattias Jonsson (S), 710 votes; Hans Linde (V), 1,628 votes; Cecilia Magnusson (M), 5,127 votes; Valter Mutt (MP), 602 votes; Lise Nordin (MP), 2,469 votes; Eva Olofsson (V), 732 votes; Leif Pagrotsky (S), 12,413 votes; Hans Rothenberg (M), 738 votes; Sven-Olof Sällström (SD), 7 votes; and Abdirizak Waberi (M), 772 votes.
 Leveling seats - Anders Flanking (C), 592 votes.

2000s

2006
Results of the 2006 general election held on 17 September 2006:

The following candidates were elected:
 Constituency seats - Claes-Göran Brandin (S), 436 votes; Gunilla Carlsson (S), 848 votes; Annelie Enochson (KD), 1,752 votes; Eva Flyborg (FP), 1,804 votes; Lisbeth Grönfeldt Bergman (M), 579 votes; Lars Hjälmered (M), 1,624 votes; Lars Johansson (S), 452 votes; Göran Lindblad (M), 1,292 votes; Hans Linde (V), 588 votes; Karla López (MP), 1,344 votes; Cecilia Magnusson (M), 4,831 votes; Eva Olofsson (V), 1,160 votes; Leif Pagrotsky (S), 13,204 votes; Hans Rothenberg (M), 790 votes; Eva Selin Lindgren (C), 1,022 votes; Cecilia Wigström (FP), 1,899 votes; and Siw Wittgren-Ahl (S), 668 votes.
 Leveling seats - Max Andersson (MP), 841 votes.

2002
Results of the 2002 general election held on 15 September 2002:

The following candidates were elected:
 Constituency seats - Erling Bager (FP), 758 votes; Claes-Göran Brandin (S), 689 votes; Gunilla Carlsson (S), 944 votes; Marianne Carlström (S), 1,190 votes; Annelie Enochson (KD), 1,734 votes; Eva Flyborg (FP), 5,742 votes; Berit Jóhannesson (V), 1,079 votes; Lars Johansson (S), 445 votes; Per Landgren (KD), 1,804 votes; Göran Lindblad (M), 1,505 votes; Johan Lönnroth (V), 3,646 votes; Cecilia Magnusson (M), 3,325 votes; Cecilia Nilsson (FP), 2,529 votes; Leif Pagrotsky (S), 13,552 votes; Claes Roxbergh (MP), 1,266 votes; Anita Sidén (M), 2,268 votes; and Siw Wittgren-Ahl (S), 577 votes.
 Leveling seats - Axel Darvik (FP), 600 votes.

1990s

1998
Results of the 1998 general election held on 20 September 1998:

The following candidates were elected:
 Constituency seats - Kia Andreasson (MP), 1,073 votes; Jan Bergqvist (S), 704 votes; Claes-Göran Brandin (S), 658 votes; Gunilla Carlsson (S), 1,853 votes; Eva Flyborg (FP), 1,980 votes; Tom Heyman (M), 4,505 votes; Sven Hulterström (S), 11,142 votes; Berit Jóhannesson (V), 1,806 votes; Per Landgren (KD), 556 votes; Göran Lindblad (M), 1,040 votes; Johan Lönnroth (V), 5,834 votes; Cecilia Magnusson (M), 3,741 votes; Ingrid Näslund (KD), 567 votes; Rolf Olsson (V), 337 votes; Anita Sidén (M), 823 votes; and Siw Wittgren-Ahl (S), 693 votes.
 Leveling seats - Lennart Fridén (M), 571 votes.

1994
Results of the 1994 general election held on 18 September 1994:

1991
Results of the 1991 general election held on 15 September 1991:

1980s

1988
Results of the 1988 general election held on 18 September 1988:

1985
Results of the 1985 general election held on 15 September 1985:

1982
Results of the 1982 general election held on 19 September 1982:

1970s

1979
Results of the 1979 general election held on 16 September 1979:

1976
Results of the 1976 general election held on 19 September 1976:

1973
Results of the 1973 general election held on 16 September 1973:

1970
Results of the 1970 general election held on 20 September 1970:

References

Riksdag constituency
Riksdag constituencies
Riksdag constituencies established in 1970